Tobias Eberhard (born 12 January 1985) is an Austrian biathlete. He competed in the 2018 Winter Olympics.

He is the older brother of biathlete Julian Eberhard.

Biathlon results
All results are sourced from the International Biathlon Union.

Olympic Games
0 medals

*The mixed relay was added as an event in 2014.

References

1985 births
Living people
Biathletes at the 2018 Winter Olympics
Austrian male biathletes
Olympic biathletes of Austria
People from Zell am See District
Sportspeople from Salzburg (state)